Dina Gorina (also spelled Qorina, born 1 November 1987) is an Azerbaijani group rhythmic gymnast. She represents her nation at international competitions.

She participated at the 2008 Summer Olympics in Beijing. 
She also competed at world championships, including at the 2005 and 2009 World Rhythmic Gymnastics Championships.

References

External links
https://database.fig-gymnastics.com/public/gymnasts/biography/1823/true?backUrl=%2Fpublic%2Fresults%2Fdisplay%2F544%3FidAgeCategory%3D8%26idCategory%3D78%23anchor_41799
http://www.magicalaction.com/Gymnasts/index.php?gymnast=Dina+Gorina
https://www.youtube.com/watch?v=3gIsJE4AWDY

1987 births
Living people
Azerbaijani rhythmic gymnasts
Place of birth missing (living people)
Gymnasts at the 2008 Summer Olympics
Olympic gymnasts of Azerbaijan
20th-century Azerbaijani women
21st-century Azerbaijani women